
Rosendale may refer to:

Places

United Kingdom
Rosendale Road in West Dulwich, South London

United States
Rosendale, Missouri, a city
Rosendale, New York, a town
Rosendale Village, New York
Rosendale, Wisconsin, a village
Rosendale (town), Wisconsin, an unincorporated community
Rosendale Township, Minnesota

People
Matt Rosendale (born 1960), American politician
Adam Rosendale (active 2017), American politician

See also
Rossendale (disambiguation)